Little Simon Pond is a small lake northwest of Old Forge in Herkimer County, New York. It drains south via an unnamed creek which flows into South Inlet.

See also
 List of lakes in New York

References 

Lakes of New York (state)
Lakes of Herkimer County, New York